Le Dernier Diamant (lit. The Last Diamond) is a French crime thriller film directed by Éric Barbier.

Cast
 Bérénice Bejo as Julia Neuville
 Yvan Attal as Simon Carrerra
 Jean-François Stévenin as Albert
 Antoine Basler as Scylla
 Jacques Spiesser as Pierre Neuville
 Annie Cordy as Inès de Boissière
 Michel Israel as Jacques Galley
 Charlie Dupont as Michael Wurtz 
 Fabrice Boutique as Kopel
 Michel Tereba as Matthias
 Isaka Sawadogo as Omar
 Leila Schaus as Sam
 Corentin Lobet as Le Fourgue

References

External links

 Le Dernier Diamant at Allocine

2014 films
2014 crime thriller films
French crime thriller films

Films directed by Éric Barbier
Films shot in Antwerp
2010s French films